The 3rd Separate Assault Brigade is a mechanized assault brigade that was formed on November 1st, 2022 as a response to the ongoing Russian invasion of Ukraine.

History 
The brigade was formed in November 2022 from the Azov Special Operations Forces (SSO), and originally formed by veterans of the Azov Regiment, and is considered to be a fully-fledged combat unit within the Ukrainian Ground Forces of the Armed Forces of Ukraine. The formation of the brigade was done with the aim of providing a highly mobile, well-armed and well-trained unit that can effectively engage in both defensive and offensive operations.

Currently, the brigade is deployed to the area of Bakhmut, a city in the Donetsk Oblast of Ukraine. The brigade is in the process of forming a second TERRA.

The Brigade was granted its Regimental Colour on 24 February 2023 by President Volodymyr Zelenskyy in a Presentation of Colours ceremony.

Structure 
As of 2023 the brigade's structure is as follows:
3rd Separate Assault Brigade, N/A
Brigade Headquarters and HQ Company
1st Mechanized Battalion
2nd Mechanized Battalion
3rd Mechanized Battalion
Tank Battalion
Brigade Field Artillery Group
 Regimental HQ and Target Acquisition Battery
Anti-Aircraft Defense Battalion
Terra Battalion (Drone reconnaissance)
Reconnaissance Company
Combat Engineer Battalion
Logistic Battalion
Signal Company
Maintenance Battalion
Radar Company
Medical Company
CBRN defense company

References 

2022 establishments in Ukraine
Brigades of the Ukrainian Ground Forces
Military units and formations established in 2022